Andrew Henry Woodhouse DSC (30 January 1923 – 15 December 2019) was a British Anglican priest. He was the Archdeacon of Ludlow from 1970 to 1982; and Archdeacon of Hereford from 1982 to 1991.

Woodhouse was educated at Lancing College and The Queen's College, Oxford. His time at Oxford was divided by wartime service with the RNVR. He was ordained in 1951 after of studying at Lincoln Theological College. After a curacy at All Saints' Poplar he was vicar of St Martin's West Drayton from 1956 to 1970, Rural Dean of Hillingdon from  1967 to 1970, rector of Wistanstow from 1970 to 1982 and a canon residentiary at Hereford Cathedral from 1982 to 1991.

Notes

1923 births
2019 deaths
People educated at Lancing College
Alumni of The Queen's College, Oxford
Recipients of the Distinguished Service Cross (United Kingdom)
Alumni of Lincoln Theological College
Archdeacons of Ludlow
Archdeacons of Hereford
Royal Naval Volunteer Reserve personnel of World War II
Royal Navy officers of World War II